Foster Township is located in Madison County, Illinois, in the United States. As of the 2010 census, its population was 4,091 and it contained 1,663 housing units.

History
Foster is the name of Oliver Foster, a pioneer settler and native of New Hampshire.

Geography

Demographics

References

External links
City-data.com
Illinois State Archives

Townships in Madison County, Illinois
Townships in Illinois